This article outlines the differences between Malaysian English, Malaysian Colloquial English (Manglish)   and British English, which for the purposes of this article is assumed to be the form of English spoken in south east England, used by the British Government, the BBC and widely understood in other parts of the United Kingdom.

Malaysian English (MyE), formally known as Malaysian Standard English (MySE), is a form of English used and spoken in Malaysia as a second language. Malaysian English should not be confused with Malaysian Colloquial English, which is famously known as Manglish, a portmanteau of the word Malay and English, or Street English.

Manglish can be likened to an English-based pidgin language or a patois and it is usually barely understandable to most speakers of English outside Malaysia except in the case of Singapore where a similar colloquial form of English is spoken known as Singlish. Though very similar, Manglish today receives more Malay influences while Singlish more Chinese.

Spelling 
Despite being traditionally-based on British English, Malaysian English has, in recent decades, been strongly influenced by American English. This can be commonly seen in web-based media and documents produced within organisations.  When using computers, the writer is typically unaware of the differences between British and American English and uses the default settings on their software spell-checker. Most computer software in Malaysia, including Microsoft Windows and Microsoft Office, come pre-set with American English as the default and these settings are seldom changed to British English, resulting in the proliferation of American English in many places of work, local universities and other places with heavy reliance on documents and content created by using computers. In schools and in the print media however, Malaysians revert to British English.

Manglish does not possess a standard written form, although many variations exist for transcribing certain words. For most purposes it is a spoken tongue.

In Malaysian education, written English is based on British English but most of the students speak in a local accent influenced by American pronunciations.

Grammar 

Much of Manglish grammatical structure is taken from varieties of Chinese and the Malay language. For example, the phrase "Why you so like that one?" means "Why are you behaving in that way" in standard English.  In Cantonese, a similar phrase would be rendered as "Dímgáai néih gám ge?" or literally "Why you like that?"  The "one" in the sample phrase does not literally mean the numeral one, instead it is used more as a suffix device. It is also sometimes rendered as "wan." The use of Manglish is discouraged at schools, where only Malaysian English is taught.

Other common characteristics are anastrophe and omission of certain prepositions and articles. For example, "I haven't seen you in a long time" becomes "Long time never seen you already".

Vocabulary

Words only used in British English 

To a large extent, standard Malaysian English is descended from British English, largely due to the country's colonisation by Britain beginning from the 18th century. But because of influence from American mass media, particularly in the form of television programmes and movies, Malaysians are also usually familiar with many American English words. For instance, both lift/elevator and lorry/truck are understood, although the British form is preferred. Only in some very limited cases is the American English form more widespread, e.g. chips instead of crisps, fries instead of chips.

Words or phrases only used in Malaysian English 

Malaysian English is gradually forming its own vocabulary, these words come from a variety of influences. Typically, for words or phrases that are based on other English words, the Malaysian English speaker may be unaware that the word or phrase is not present in British or American English.

Different meanings 
This is a list of words and phrases that have one meaning in British English and another in Malaysian English.

Pronunciation 

In Malaysian English, the last syllable of a word is sometimes not pronounced with the strength that it would be in British English.

Also, p and f are sometimes pronounced somewhat similarly among speakers of Malay descent. For example, the two Malay names 'Fazlin' and 'Pazlin' may sound almost identical when spoken by Malays, whereas this confusion would not arise when spoken by a British Speaker.

See also

 Malaysian English
 Regional accents of English speakers

References

External links 
 http://www.asiaosc.org/enwiki/page/Malaysian_Proper_Noun_List.html - common proper noun list used in Malaysian languages

Comparison of forms of English
British English
Languages of Malaysia